Fixing may refer to:
 The present participle of the verb "to fix", an action meaning maintenance, repair, and operations
 "fixing someone up" in the context of arranging or finding a social date for someone
 "Fixing", craving an addictive drug, hence "getting your fix" or "jonesing" (from the 1960s)
 Match fixing, to illegally predetermine the outcome of a sporting event or other contest, also can be referred to as "the fix" as in the common phrase "the fix is in"
 Price fixing, an agreement between business competitors to sell the same product or service at the same price

Science and medicine
 Spaying and neutering, often called "fixing" or the sterilization of an animal

See also
 
 
Fix (disambiguation)
Fixation (disambiguation)
Fixed (disambiguation)
Fixer (disambiguation)
The Fix (disambiguation)
The Fix Is In (disambiguation)